Shide Group is a development, media and energy corporation based in Dalian, China.

History
Founded in 2002, Shide Group was also the owner of Dalian Shide, an association football club. For a time, Shide Group also owned other football clubs such as Sichuan First City and Dalian Sidelong.

See also
Advanced materials industry in China

References

External links
Official website
What's Behind the Football Deal?
Leeds Utd 'attracts China tycoon'
China's 40 Richest

Companies based in Dalian
Companies listed on the Shanghai Stock Exchange
Companies established in 1992